Babki may refer to:
 Babki, alternate name of Bavaki-ye Amir Bakhtiar, Iran
 Babki, Greater Poland Voivodeship, Poland
 Babki, Warmian-Masurian Voivodeship, Poland